Beata Zawadzka (born 26 June 1986 in Warsaw) is a Polish chess player. She won the bronze medal with the Polish team at the 35th Chess Olympiad in 2002.

References

Footnotes

External links
 
 

1986 births
Living people
Polish female chess players
Chess woman grandmasters
Sportspeople from Warsaw